Can't Get Enough is the fourth studio album released by Swedish musician Eagle-Eye Cherry in October 2012 by Vertigo Records.

Track listing

References

2012 albums
Eagle-Eye Cherry albums
Albums produced by Klas Åhlund
Vertigo Records albums